Robert MacRae  is Her Majesty's Deputy Bailiff of Jersey.

Education 
MacRae attended La Moye School, Victoria College Prep and Victoria College before reading Law at the University of Exeter.

Career 

After being called to the English Bar in 1990 he practised in England for 10 years. He returned to the Island in 2001 and was called to the Jersey Bar in 2003. In 2005 he became a partner in Carey Olsen's Jersey office. He was appointed a Crown Advocate in 2008. He was sworn in as Her Majesty's Attorney General on 5 May 2015.

On 18 June 2019, MacRae was announced as the next Deputy Bailiff of Jersey, and on 6 January 2020, he was sworn into office.

References 

Jersey lawyers
21st-century King's Counsel
Living people
Members of the Middle Temple
Alumni of the University of Exeter
People educated at Victoria College, Jersey
1968 births
Deputy Bailiffs of Jersey